Governor Robinson may refer to:

Charles L. Robinson (1818–1894), 1st Governor of Kansas
Frederick Philipse Robinson (1763–1852), Governor of Tobago from 1816 to 1828
George Robinson, 1st Marquess of Ripon (1827–1909), Viceroy and Governor-General of India from 1880 to 1884
George D. Robinson (1834–1896), 34th Governor of Massachusetts
Hercules Robinson, 1st Baron Rosmead (1824–1897), 5th Governor of Hong Kong, the 14th Governor of New South Wales, 1st Governor of Fiji, and 8th Governor of New Zealand
James Fisher Robinson (1800–1882), 22nd Governor of Kentucky
James L. Robinson (1838–1887), Acting Governor of North Carolina in 1883
John S. Robinson (governor) (1804–1860), 22nd Governor of Vermont, grandson of Moses Robinson
Joseph Taylor Robinson (1872–1937), 23rd Governor of Arkansas
Lucius Robinson (1810–1891), 26th Governor of New York
Moses Robinson (1741–1813), 2nd Governor of the Vermont Republic
Robert P. Robinson (Delaware politician) (1869–1939), 57th Governor of Delaware
Roland Robinson, 1st Baron Martonmere (1907–1989), Governor of Bermuda from 1964 to 1972
William C. F. Robinson (1834–1897), 11th Governor of South Australia
William Robinson (colonial administrator, born 1836) (1836–1912), 11th Governor of Hong Kong
William Rose Robinson (1822–1886), Acting Governor of Madras in 1875